is an adventure Role-playing video game developed and published by Atlus for the PlayStation Portable. The game is a spin-off of the Tokyo Majin Gakuen media franchise, and was released in Japan on April 22, 2010.

Gameplay 
The game is combination of visual novel and dungeon crawler.

When it’s time for school, the player can talk with classmates while searching for clues and tracking down cursed hanafuda cards. The emotion input system lets the player respond to discussions and bond with sub-characters by selecting a feeling. School exploration is done via a menu.

Combat 
Dungeons are shown from a first-person perspective. While exploring, the player can trigger commands like "jump" with the face buttons. There is no transition prior to battles.

Plot

Story 
The story centered on a group of high school students tracking down cursed hanafuda cards that released demons called the "hidden people" into the human world.

Music 
The opening theme , composed by Kenichi Tsuchiya and sung by Haruka Tomatsu. The ending theme   is composed by Atsushi Kitajoh and sung by Haruka Tomatsu.

CD Drama 
Volume 1 was released on June 23, 2010 and volume 2 was released on July 22, 2010 in Japan by Frontier Works.

References

External links 
Official website 

Adventure games
Atlus games
Tokyo Majin Gakuen Denki
Role-playing video games
PlayStation Portable games
PlayStation Portable-only games
2010 video games
Japan-exclusive video games
Video games developed in Japan
Video games set in Tokyo